Raymond Walter Yagiello (September 21, 1923 – June 9, 1999) was an American football player and coach. He served the head football coach at Montclair State University in Upper Montclair, New Jersey from 1957 to 1959, compiling a record of 8–14–1. Yagiello was taken in the 1948 NFL Draft by the Los Angeles Rams as the 5th pick in the 22nd round (200th overall). Yagiello had played college football at Catawba College. Prior to Catawba, Yagiello had attended Kearny High School.

Head coaching record

References

External links
 

1923 births
1999 deaths
Catawba Indians football players
Franklin & Marshall Diplomats football players
Kearny High School (New Jersey) alumni
Los Angeles Rams players
Montclair State Red Hawks football coaches
People from Kearny, New Jersey
People from Orange, New Jersey
Sportspeople from Essex County, New Jersey
Sportspeople from Hudson County, New Jersey
Players of American football from New Jersey